The Martyred Presidents is a 1901 American film directed by Edwin S. Porter.

Plot summary 

The film, just over a minute long, is composed of two shots. In the first, a girl sits at the base of an altar or tomb, her face hidden from the camera. At the center of the altar, a viewing portal displays the portraits of three U.S. Presidents—Abraham Lincoln, James A. Garfield, and William McKinley—each victims of assassination.

In the second shot, which runs just over eight seconds long, an assassin kneels at the feet of Lady Justice.

Production

Evocative of early magic lantern and Phantasmagoria shows, The Martyred Presidents is part of a cycle of films made by the Edison Studios to chronicle the McKinley assassination in Buffalo, New York at the 1901 Pan-American Exposition.  An Edison catalog from the time suggests to exhibitors that The Martyred Presidents be used as a closing tableau when "...shown in connection with the funeral ceremonies of the illustrious McKinley."

Notes

External links 

1901 films
1900s English-language films
American black-and-white films
American silent short films
Films about assassinations
Assassination of Abraham Lincoln
Cultural depictions of Abraham Lincoln
Assassination of James A. Garfield
Cultural depictions of James A. Garfield
Assassination of William McKinley
Cultural depictions of William McKinley
Films directed by Edwin S. Porter
1900s American films